The syli was the currency of Guinea between 1971 and 1985. It was subdivided into 100 cauris. The Maninkakan word syli means "elephant", while cauri refers to the shells formerly used as currency. The syli replaced the Guinean franc at a rate of 1 syli = 10 francs.

Coins of 50 cauris, 1, 2 and 5 sylis were made of aluminium. Banknotes of the 1971 series were issued in denominations of 10, 25, 50 and 100 sylis. A second series of banknotes was issued in 1980, this time in different colours and with four additional denominations – 1, 2, 5 and 500 sylis notes.

The syli was replaced by the franc guinéen in 1985 at par.

Banknotes

References

Guinea at Infotech 2003

Currencies of Africa
Modern obsolete currencies
1971 establishments in Guinea
1985 disestablishments in Guinea
Economic history of Guinea